Four ships of the Royal Navy have been named HMS Canada, after the former British colony and modern Dominion of Canada:

 was a 74-gun third rate ship of the line launched in 1765. She became a prison ship in 1810, and was sold broken up in 1834.
HMS Canada was to have been a 112-gun  first rate. She was laid down in 1814, but cancelled in 1832 and broken up on the stocks.
 was a screw corvette launched in 1881 and sold in 1897.
HMS Canada (1913) was a battleship that the Chilean Navy had ordered as Almirante Latorre. She was launched in 1913, but the British government purchased her in 1914 after the outbreak of the First World War. The British government resold her to Chile in 1920, and as Almirante Latorre she served the Chilean Navy until she was broken up in Japan after 1959.

Battle honours
Ships named HMS Canada are entitled to carry the following battle honours:

St. Kitts 1782
The Saints 1782
Donegal 1798
Jutland 1916

See also
 
 
 , an 

Royal Navy ship names